Whatever I Say Means I Love You is the fifth studio album released by American country artist Donna Fargo. The album was released in July 1975 on Dot Records and was produced by Stan Silver. It was Fargo's final album for the Dot label and produced four singles between 1975 and 1976 that each charted on the Billboard country music chart.

Background and content 
Whatever I Say Means I Love You was recorded in a series of sessions between April and October 1974. The first session in April recorded the song "What Will the New Year Bring". The sessions in June and October of that year produced the album's final tracks. Whatever I Say Means I Love You was recorded at the Ray Stevens Sound Laboratory in Nashville, Tennessee, United States, Fargo's first release to be recorded at this particular studio. The album consisted of eleven tracks of material, all of which were written by Fargo herself. The album's themes related to that of optimism and happiness, with tracks such as "Hello Little Bluebird", "Sing, Sing, Sing", and "Hip on Happiness".  Whatever I Say Means I Love You was released as an LP record with six songs on the album's "A" side of the record and five songs on the album's "B" side. It has not been reissued on a compact disc since its original release.

Release 
Whatever I Say Means I Love You spawned its first single "Hello Little Bluebird" in June 1975. The song became the album's only major hit, reaching #14 on the Billboard Magazine Hot Country Singles chart and #8 on the Canadian RPM Country Singles chart. The title track was the album's second single and peaked at #38 on the Billboard country chart, followed by the album's eighth track "What Will the New Year Bring" in September 1975, which peaked at #58 on the Billboard Hot Country Singles Chart. It spawned its fourth and final single "You're Not Charlie Brown" in February 1976, which reached #60 on the country chart, becoming Fargo's lowest charting single up to that point. The album was officially released in July 1975 and peaked at #28 on the Billboard Magazine Top Country Albums chart, Fargo's first album to peak outside of the country Top 10.

The album was reviewed retrospectively by Allmusic and received two and a half out of five stars, Fargo's lowest rating from the website.

Track listing 
All songs composed by Donna Fargo.

Side one
"Hello Little Bluebird"
"Whatever I Say (Means I Love You)"
"I Didn't Mean (To Run Him Away)"
"2 Sweet 2 Be Forgotten"
"Sing, Sing, Sing"

Side two
"You're Not Charlie Brown (And I'm Not Raggedy Ann)"
"Hip on Happiness"
"What Will the New Year Bring"
"Rain Song"
"I Have the Strangest Feeling (You're Gone)"
"One More Memory"

Personnel 
 Jimmy Capps – guitar
 Jerry Carrigan – drums
 Buzz Cason – background vocals
 Pete Drake – steel guitar
 Ray Edenton – rhythm guitar
 Donna Fargo – lead vocals
 Farrell Morris – percussion
 Nashville String Machine – strings
 Leon Rhodes – bass guitar
 Hargus "Pig" Robbins – piano
 Billy Sanford – guitar
 Jerry Smith – piano
 Buddy Spicher – fiddle
 Wendy Suits – background vocals
 Diane Tidwell – background vocals
 Shirley Temple Choir – background vocals
 Bergen White – background vocals

Sales chart positions 
Album

Singles

References 

1975 albums
Donna Fargo albums
Dot Records albums